This is a list of known American football players who have played for the Baltimore Colts (1947–50) of the All-America Football Conference and later the National Football League. It includes players that have played at least one match with the team.

A
 Lee Artoe
 Sisto Averno

B
 Dick Barwegan
 Bill Baumgartner
 Hub Bechtol
 Pete Berezney
 Warren Beson
 Blondy Black
 George Blanda
 Ernie Blandin
 Lamar Blount
 Hardy Brown
 George Buksar
 Adrian Burk

C
 Leon Campbell
 Ernie Case
 Jim Castiglia
 Herb Coleman
 Rip Collins
 Don Colo
 Ken Cooper
 Bert Corley
 Bob Cowan
 Armand Cure
 Hal Crisler

D
 Lamar Davis
 Spiro Dellerba
 Art Donovan
 Andy Dudish

F
 Frank Filchock
 Ollie Fletcher
 Aubrey Fowler
 Barry French

G
 Lu Gambino
 Dub Garrett
 Gorham Getchell
 Ed Grain
 Rex Grossman
 George Groves

H
 Dick Handley
 George Hekkers
 Luke Higgins
 Billy Hillenbrand

J
 Chick Jagade
 Jon Jenkins
 Bob Jensen
 Ralph Jones

K
 Mike Kasap
 Bob Kelly
 Eddie King
 Wayne Kingery
 Veto Kissell
 Al Klug
 Joe Kodba
 Floyd Konetsky

L
 Jim Landrigan
 Jake Leicht
 Bill Leonard
 Augie Lio
 Bobby Livingstone

M
 Elmer Madar
 Chick Maggioli
 Vic Marino
 Lew Mayne
 Geno Mazzanti
 Len McCormick
 John Mellus
 Bus Mertes
 Gil Meyers
 Gerry Moersdorf
 Earl Murray
 Chet Mutryn
 Rudy Mobley

N
 Bob Nelson
 Steve Nemeth
 John North
 Bob Nowaskey

O
 Charlie O'Rourke
 Bob Oristaglio
 Jim Owens

P
 Paul Page
 Bob Perina
 George Perpich
 Bob Pfohl
 Mike Phillips
 Ollie Poole
 Felto Prewitt

R
 Herb Rich
 Ralph Ruthstrom

S
 Paul Salata
 John Schweder
 Bud Schwenk
 Al Sidorik
 Sig Sigurdson
 Jack Simmons
 Frank Sinkwich
 Joe Smith
 Frank Spaniel
 Jim Spavital
 Art Spinney
 Jim Spruill
 Ralph Stewart
 Billy Stone
 Johnny Sylvester

T
 Ray Terrell
 Al Tillman
 Y. A. Tittle
 Buzz Trebotich

U
 Mitch Ucovich

V
 Sam Vacanti
 Johnny Vardian

W
 Herman Wedemeyer
 Joel Williams
 Win Williams
 John Wright

Y
 Bill Yanchar
 Frank Yokas

Z
 Ernie Zalejski
 George Zorich

References
 1947 Colts roster
 1948 Colts Roster
 1949 Colts roster
 1950 Colts roster

 
Baltimore Colts (1947-50)
Baltimore Colts (1947-50)
Baltimore-related lists